Pier Francesco Pingitore (born 27 September 1934) is an Italian director, screenwriter, playwright and author.

Biography 
Born in Catanzaro, Pingitore started his career as a journalist, then he was with Mario Castellacci, Luciano Cirri and Piero Palumbo the founder in 1965 of the "Bagaglino" Theatre (originally named "Bragaglino" as a tribute to Anton Giulio Bragaglia) in Rome. A year later, he published the song "Avanti ragazzi di Buda". After a local success, from 1973 the stage company got a large success on television with the RAI variety show Dove sta Zazà? and with its numerous successor shows. In 1968, Pingitore made his film debut directing a documentary about the protests of the European youth, then, from 1975 to 1983 and again in 1992 he wrote and directed a series of satirical comedies starred by Pippo Franco and by several components of the "Bagaglino" company,  targeting various aspects of Italian society including political scandals, football, school, and the music industry.

References

External links 
 

Living people
1934 births
Italian film directors
Italian screenwriters
Italian male screenwriters
Italian dramatists and playwrights
Italian male dramatists and playwrights
People from Calabria
People from Catanzaro